Bischoff's tree frog (Boana bischoffi) is a species of frog in the family Hylidae endemic to Brazil. Its natural habitats are subtropical or tropical moist lowland forests, rivers, freshwater lakes, freshwater marshes, and plantations.
It is threatened by habitat loss.

References

Boana
Endemic fauna of Brazil
Taxonomy articles created by Polbot
Amphibians described in 1887